Rikard Bergh (born 14 June 1966) is a former professional tennis player from Sweden. He enjoyed most of his tennis success while playing doubles. During his career, he won six doubles titles and finished as a runner-up five times. He achieved a career-high doubles ranking of world No. 37 in 1992.

Since retiring, Bergh moved to Dallas, Texas He has worked as a pro in several country clubs.

Career finals

Doubles: 11 (6 wins, 5 losses)

External links
 
 

Swedish male tennis players
Sportspeople from Örebro
Living people
1966 births
20th-century Swedish people